Enterococcus xinjiangensis  is a Gram-positive bacterium from the genus of Enterococcus which has been isolated from yogurt from Xinjiang.

References

xinjiangensis
Bacteria described in 2020